The Bird Innovator was an American four-engined executive amphibious airplane modified from a Consolidated PBY Catalina by the Bird Corporation.

Design and development
During the late 1960s Forrest Bird and his Bird Corporation developed a conversion for the PBY Catalina to improve performance.

The Catalina was modified by adding two 340 hp (254 kW) Lycoming GSO-480-B2D6 engines positioned outboard of the original Pratt & Whitney radials to increase range and performance. (These engines and cowlings had originally been installed on the McKinnon four engine Grumman Goose. When they were removed by McKinnon to convert the Goose to twin turboprop power, they were purchased by Bird for his PBY Innovator conversion. Engineering for the Innovator conversion was performed by Spectro engineering of Los Angeles).

The wing attach fittings were strengthened and fuel capacity increased by adding fuel bladders to the outer wing panels. The engineer's controls were previously moved to the cockpit by Southern California Air Service during their "Landseaair" conversion to allow operation without a Flight Engineer. Propeller control for the two Lycomings was electrical. The Lycoming's propellers were fully reversible, distinctly improving the handling dexterity on the water. The main engine propellers were controlled by the standard mechanical linkage. The larger "Super Cat" rudder and increased power main engines (1830–94) had been installed at an earlier time. The angle of incidence of the wing and horizontal surfaces were not modified during the conversion.

The effect of the extra engines exceeded expectations, such that it was capable of a cruising speed of 152 mph (244 km/h) on four engines, and of maintaining 124 mph with one of the main engines feathered. The original PBY cruised at about 125 mph. The downside of the Innovator conversion was the gross weight of the aircraft increased to over 29,000 lbs. This exceeded the 27,000 lbs maximum that the US Military considered safe for water operations.

Operational history
Only one Innovator was converted, a 28-5AMC Canso A (This was a Consolidated built aircraft. Built in November 1941 (under a contract for Canada), registration N5907, formerly RCAF serial number 9746, which was already used by Dr. Bird as a flying classroom/salesroom for medical equipment. Bird Corporation registered it as N81RD, and sold it in 1976, when its registration reverted to N5907. In the late 1970s, Pyramid Corporation purchased the Innovator and converted it to a camera platform to count whales along the west coast of the Americas. A plastic bubble with camera was installed in the nose and cameras were installed in the right blister and air stair door.

The Innovator was stored in Titusville, Florida at the end of this contract. While in storage a local law enforcement official decided that, since it was a large seaplane, it must have been used for illegal purposes and the aircraft was confiscated. Many years of lawsuits later, the Innovator was exonerated but time and the Florida sun had taken its toll. In the early 1990s, a New Mexico aircraft salesmen bought the Innovator, registered it as N5PY and spent the better part of a year restoring the aircraft to flying status. In 1997, during inspection, the new owners found an improper repair to the main keel truss from an earlier gear-up landing in the 1960s.

The extent of the damage, the previous attempt at repair and corrosion issues showed the need for a major IRAN (Inspect and repair as necessary) of the aircraft. At this time it was decided that, due to the extreme weight gain and aging complexity of the Innovator conversion, returning the aircraft to its original twin engine "Landseaire" condition was the safest and best option for the future preservation of the aircraft. As of 2013, restoration continues with the bow, pylon, and tail sections completely restored and a complete new keel truss, keelson, stringers, and bottom skins currently being installed; currently registered as N5PY.

Specifications (Innovator)

See also

Notes

References
Legg, David (2002). Consolidated PBY Catalina: The Peacetime Record. UK: Airlife Publishing Ltd. 

1960s United States special-purpose aircraft
Flying boats
Amphibious aircraft
Innovator
Parasol-wing aircraft
Four-engined tractor aircraft
Four-engined piston aircraft
Aircraft first flown in 1967